Chithirayil Nilachoru is a 2013 Indian Tamil-language drama film written and directed by R. Sundarrajan and produced by Murugesan. The film features Prakash Nath, Vasundhara Kashyap and Sara Arjun, with Ashok Sundarrajan and Ganja Karuppu playing other pivotal characters. The film opened to mixed reviews upon release on 18 October 2013.

Plot 
Gauri gets into a quarrel with an auto rickshaw driver for disrupting the purpose of her visit. She falls for him, just when she wants to wreck his life in return.

Cast 

 Prakash Nath as Muthukumar
 Vasundhara as Gauri
 Baby Sara as Oviya
 Ashok Sundarrajan as Ashok
 Ganja Karuppu as Subramani
 Kovai Sarala
 K. P. Jagannath as Jagan
 Delhi Ganesh as Gauri's father
 Ravi Prakash
 Kalairani as Shop Owner
 R. Sundarrajan as Sundaram
 Fathima Babu as Church Mother
 Anuradha Krishnamoorthy
 Singamuthu
 Aarthi
 King Kong
 Perazhagi Gayathri Raj as cameo appearance
 Bhumika as a fake beggar / mentally challenged person (special appearance)
 Radha Ravi as Police Inspector (special appearance)

Production 
R. Sundarrajan, a prominent director in the 1980s, chose to make a comeback into direction with the film after 12 years. The film also marked the comeback of child actress Sara Arjun, who had received critical acclaim for her performance in A. L. Vijay's Deiva Thirumagal (2011). She earned up to 1 lakh rupees per day for her role in the film. Sundarrajan's son Ashok, also made his debut as an actor with the project.

Soundtrack 
The film's soundtrack was composed by Ilaiyaraaja. The audio of the film was met with a mixed response, with a critic claiming "a couple of tracks possess the magic, the rest are left wanting."

Release 
The film opened to mixed reviews from critics. A critic from The Times of India noted "If this had been a first-timer's film, we would have felt pity but coming from a veteran, who has given us at least half-a-dozen memorable films, we feel cheated."

References

External links 
 

2013 films
Films scored by Ilaiyaraaja
2010s Tamil-language films
Films directed by R. Sundarrajan